The United States Junior Chamber, also known as the Jaycees, JCs or JCI USA, is a leadership training service organization and civic organization for people between the ages of 18 and 40. It is a branch of Junior Chamber International (JCI). Areas of emphasis are business development, management skills, individual training, community service, and international connections. The U.S. Junior Chamber is a not-for-profit corporation/organization as described under Internal Revenue Code 501(c)(4).

Established as the United States Junior Chamber of Commerce on January 21, 1920, it provided opportunities for young men to develop personal and leadership skills through service to others. The Jaycees later expanded to include women after the United States Supreme Court ruled in the 1984 case Roberts v. United States Jaycees that Minnesota could prohibit sex discrimination in private organizations. The following year, 1985, marked the final year of the U.S. Jaycee Women (also known as Jayceettes or Jayceens), an organization that lasted 10 years and at its convention in 1984 in Atlanta boasted 59,000 members.

At its membership peak in 1976, the U.S. Jaycees boasted a membership total of 356,000 men between the ages of 18 and 35. Rules were later changed to allow members to stay active until age 40.

Jaycee Creed
The Jaycee Creed was adopted in 1946 at the United States Junior Chamber of Commerce National Convention.

The code reads as follows:
We believe:
 That faith in God gives meaning and purpose to human life.
 That the brotherhood of man transcends the sovereignty of nations.
 That economic justice can best be won by free men through free enterprise.
 That government should be of laws rather than of men.
 That earth's great treasure lies in human personality.
 And that service to humanity is the best work of life.

Notable U.S. Jaycees
Larry Bird – professional  basketball player (Boston Celtics)
Warren E. Burger – Chief Justice of the United States
Bill Clinton – President of the United States
Ken Coon – Little Rock psychologist, former Arkansas Republican state chairman;?served as Arkansas state Jaycee president
Cal Cunningham – North Carolina State Senator
Gerald Ford – President of the United States
Wendell Ford – U.S. Senator, Governor of Kentucky, also served as U.S. Jaycees President
John Wayne Gacy – serial killer, clown and businessman; served Jaycees for many years and helped organize prison chapters
Bill Gates – Chairman of Microsoft
Al Gore – Vice President of the United States
Mike Gravel - US Senator from Alaska, conducted national Jaycee tour advocating tax reform and free enterprise in 1958
Larry Holmes – Former Heavyweight Boxing Champion
Rogers Hornsby – Hall of Fame Major League Baseball player
Howard Hughes – industrialist
Hubert Humphrey – Vice President of the United States
Bradley Joseph – composer and  recording artist
Edmund Kemper – serial killer known as the Coed Killer; became a member of the Jaycees while incarcerated
Charles Lindbergh – aviator
Tom Monaghan – founder of Domino's Pizza
Walter Mondale – Vice President of the United States
Richard Nixon – President of the United States
Elvis Presley –  musician, actor
Lani Rae Rafko-Wilson – Miss America 1988
Ronald Reagan – President of the United States, Governor of California,  actor
John Jacob Rhodes – U.S. Representative from Arizona
Charles Thone – Governor of Nebraska; served as Nebraska state Jaycee president
Robert Van Pelt - United States District Judge, drafter of the Federal Rules of Evidence

See also
Lions Club
Rotary International

References

External links

United States Junior Chamber

1920 establishments in the United States
501(c)(4) nonprofit organizations
Service organizations based in the United States

Non-profit organizations based in St. Louis
Youth organizations established in 1920